Gornja Drenova can refer to:

 Gornja Drenova, Croatia, a village near Sveti Ivan Zelina, Croatia
 Gornja Drenova, Serbia, a town near Prijepolje, Serbia